The 2016–17 James Madison Dukes men's basketball team represented James Madison University during the 2016–17 NCAA Division I men's basketball season. The Dukes, led by first-year head coach Louis Rowe, played their home games at the James Madison University Convocation Center in Harrisonburg, Virginia as members of the Colonial Athletic Association. They finished the season 10–23, 7–11 in CAA play to finish in a tie for seventh place. They defeated Drexel in the first round of the CAA tournament to advance to the quarterfinals where they lost to College of Charleston.

Previous season 
The Dukes finished the 2015–16 season 21–11, 11–7 record in CAA play to finish in a tie for third place. The Dukes lost in the quarterfinals of CAA tournament to William & Mary.

Despite finishing with 21 wins, on March 14, 2016, James Madison fired head coach Matt Brady. He was 139–127 in eight seasons with James Madison. On March 31, 2016, the school hired Louis Rowe, a JMU alum, as head coach.

Departures

Incoming Transfers

Recruiting
James Madison did not have any incoming players in the 2016 recruiting class.

Roster

Schedule and results

|-
!colspan=9 style=| Non-conference regular season

|-
!colspan=9 style=| CAA regular season

|-
!colspan=9 style=| CAA tournament

See also
2016–17 James Madison Dukes women's basketball team

Notes

References

James Madison Dukes men's basketball seasons
James Madison
James Madison